Naevus are a British experimental rock group. Formed in London in 1998 by Lloyd James (vocals, acoustic guitar) and Joanne Owen (bass, accordion), Naevus were often categorised as part of the 'neofolk' genre. Their music has also drawn comparison with acts such as Swans and Wire, and often includes elements of industrial music.

The band released four albums between 1999 and 2004 before expanding to a four-piece with the addition of John Murphy (drums) and Greg Ferrari (electric guitar). Their first album with the expanded line-up was Silent Life, which was a critical success, and included contributions from members of Urge Within, Sieben, and Current 93. Their sixth album Relatively Close to the Sea saw them combining elements of their earlier post-punk sounds alongside more melodic material and progressive rock elements. In 2009, Hunter Barr returned as drummer, having previously played on EP The Body Speaks in 2004, and the EP Days that Go followed in 2010. The seventh Naevus album, The Division of Labour, was completed by Lloyd James as a solo effort and was released in May 2012. In 2013, the compilation CDs Stations and Others were released, gathering together all singles, B-sides and compilation tracks from 2001 to 2012 as well as new and previously unreleased material. The EP Backsaddling was released in 2014, followed by the eighth and ninth Naevus studio albums, Curses and Time Again, in 2018 and 2020 respectively.

Discography

Studio albums
Truffles of Love (1999), Wooden Lung
Soil (2001), S.P.K.R.
Behaviour (2002), Operative
Perfection is a Process (2004), Operative/Old Europa Cafe
Silent Life (2007), Hau Ruck!
Relatively Close to the Sea (2008), Hau Ruck!
The Division of Labour (2012), Hau Ruck!/Klanggalerie
Curses (2018), Wooden Lung/Old Europa Cafe
Time Again (2020), Hau Ruck!

EPs 
Sail Away (2003), Hau Ruck!
The Body Speaks (2004), Hau Ruck!
Go Grow (2008), Hau Ruck!
Days that Go (2010), Hau Ruck!
Backsaddling (2014), 4iB

Live album
Appetite and Application (2014), Klanggalerie

Collaborative releases 
This is not Failure (1999, with Womb and Leisure Hive), not on label
Document Three (2004, with KnifeLadder), Terra Fria
Bedtime/Badtime (2005, with Spiritual Front), Old Europa Cafe
Music Box 2008 (2008, with Rose McDowall and Sonver), Dagaz Music

Compilations 
 Stations (2013), Tourette
 Others (2013), Tourette
 Water's Work (2018), Wooden Lung

References

External links
 Naevus on Bandcamp
 Naevus at Discogs
 Naevus at Last.fm
 Naevus interview at Compulsion Online

Neofolk music groups
British industrial music groups
Musical groups established in 1998
Musical groups from London
1998 establishments in England